Kaftanka is a rural locality (a settlement) in Kilinchinsky Selsoviet, Privolzhsky District, Astrakhan Oblast, Russia. The population was 31 as of 2010. There is one street.

Geography 
Kaftanka is located 14 km southeast of Nachalovo (the district's administrative centre) by road. Biryukovka is the nearest rural locality.

References 

Rural localities in Privolzhsky District, Astrakhan Oblast